DeSales University (CDP) is a census-designated place located in Upper Saucon Township in Lehigh County, Pennsylvania. As of the 2020 census, the population was 985 residents.

The CDP is part of the Lehigh Valley metropolitan area, which had a population of 861,899 and was the 68th most populous metropolitan area in the U.S. as of the 2020 census. It includes the main campus of DeSales University.

References

Census-designated places in Lehigh County, Pennsylvania
Census-designated places in Pennsylvania